Lothar Budzinski-Kreth (7 August 1886 – 1 March 1955) was a German international footballer.

References

1886 births
1955 deaths
Association football midfielders
German footballers
Germany international footballers